Stephen Keith Benjamin (born December 1, 1969) is an American politician and businessman currently serving as the Director of the Office of Public Engagement for the Biden administration, and also as the one of the senior advisors to president Biden since February 27, 2023. He previously served as the 70th mayor of Columbia, South Carolina, from July 2010 to January 2022. He was the first African American mayor in the city's history. Before serving as mayor, he worked in the Columbia metropolitan area as an attorney and served on various charitable organizations. On November 8, 2017, Benjamin won re-election for a third term as mayor with no votes as no other candidate filed. Benjamin was declared re-elected. Benjamin served as the 76th president of the United States Conference of Mayors from 2018 to 2019.

Early life and education 
Benjamin's parents are from Orangeburg, South Carolina, but relocated to Queens during the Great Migration in the 1960s. Benjamin moved to Columbia to attend college. He earned a bachelor's degree in political science from the University of South Carolina in 1991 and a Juris Doctor from the University of South Carolina School of Law in 1994.

As a student at the University of South Carolina, Benjamin was actively involved in the student chapter of NAACP, eventually becoming president. He was elected as student body president during his undergraduate career and served as president of the student bar association during his third year of law school. He is a member of Kappa Alpha Psi and Sigma Pi Phi fraternities.

Career 
In 1999, Benjamin was appointed by Democratic Governor Jim Hodges to lead the South Carolina Department of Probation, Parole, and Pardon Services, a position which he held until 2003. In 2002, Benjamin led an unsuccessful campaign for attorney general of South Carolina as a Democratic candidate, losing to Republican Henry McMaster by a margin of 11%.

Benjamin is the principal of the Benjamin Law Firm, LLC, in Columbia, where his practice emphasized governmental strategic planning, administrative and regulatory work, municipal finance and general business matters.

Mayor of Columbia 
In 2010, Benjamin won a special election to become the mayor of Columbia, besting Kirkman Finlay III in a runoff to succeed Bob Coble. In November 2017, Benjamin was the only candidate to file for mayoral election. Benjamin, therefore, did not appear on the ballot and was automatically declared to be re-elected without any votes. On February 4, 2021, Benjamin announced that he would not seek re-election in 2021.

Later career 
Benjamin currently serves as the Board Chair of the First Responder Network Authority (FirstNet Authority), an appointment by the Biden Administration. He taught a leadership class at the Harvard T.H. Chan School of Public Health as a senior leadership fellow. He is co-chair of the Center for US Global Leadership with the U.S. Global Leadership Coalition. He is also a member of the Advisory Board of the BGR Group. He serves as chairman of the Board of the Flex Association, a group representing gig worker companies like Lyft, DoorDash and Instacart.

In February 2023, Benjamin was appointed to serve as a senior advisor to President Joe Biden and director of the Office of Public Engagement, succeeding former Atlanta Mayor Keisha Lance Bottoms.

Personal life
Benjamin is married to DeAndrea G. Benjamin, a judge on the United States Court of Appeals for the Fourth Circuit. They have two daughters.

Electoral history

Benjamin was the only candidate to file; he was automatically declared re-elected with no votes.

Recognition and awards
 The Root's 100 Influential Black Americans (2011 & 2013)
The Phoenix Award for Outstanding Contributions to Disaster Recovery by a Public Official (2017)

References

External links 

 Official website

|-

1969 births
20th-century African-American people
21st-century African-American politicians
21st-century American politicians
African-American mayors in South Carolina
African-American people in South Carolina politics
African-American state cabinet secretaries
Biden administration personnel
Living people
Mayors of Columbia, South Carolina
Politicians from New York City
Presidents of the United States Conference of Mayors
South Carolina Democrats
South Carolina lawyers
State cabinet secretaries of South Carolina
University of South Carolina School of Law alumni